Renz Michael Vijungco Valerio (born November 10, 1998) is a Filipino actor and model. He is currently signed under an exclusive contract with GMA Artist Center until he left in 2019 when his contract expired for 13 years.

Career
Renz started his career as a TV commercial model and gained attention when he appeared in Lady's Choice sandwich spread commercial with the popular tagline "Isipin mo na lang ham yan!". The commercial went viral that it was even spoof in Bubble Gang. In 2006, he started his career a child star in QTV's Noel, where he played the titular role. From then on, he stars in different GMA drama series and movies.

In 2011, Renz gained attention and was nominated as Best Child Actor in 60th FAMAS Awards for his deft portrayal as the young Luis in the critically acclaimed film The Road.

Filmography

Television

Movies

Accolades

Awards and nominations

References

External links

1998 births
Living people
People from Antipolo
Male actors from Rizal
Filipino male child actors

GMA Network personalities